Rudník is a village and municipality in Myjava District in the Trenčín Region of north-western Slovakia.

History
In historical records the village was first mentioned in 1955.

Geography
The municipality lies at an altitude of 350 metres and covers an area of 9.381 km². It has a population of about 728 people.

References

External links

 Official page
http://www.statistics.sk/mosmis/eng/run.html

Villages and municipalities in Myjava District